Thunder Prince is a 1987 English language adaptation of the Korean animated film, Heungnyongwanggwa Bihodongja (흑룡왕과 비호동자,  "The Black Dragon King and the Guardian") (1982) by IFD Films and Arts Ltd.

Plot
The movie is about a young boy, whose father, Blue Thunder, was murdered by the villainous "Black Mantis." After Black Mantis kills his father and steals the family fighting style, Blue Thunder's son takes on the name "Thunder Prince" and vows revenge.

He comes upon a wise old man who teaches him how to fight, but discourages revenge. When face-to-face with Black Mantis, Thunder Prince must decide which he will choose once and for all, honor or revenge.

Cast 
 Director: Lenny Washington
 Producer: Joseph Lai
 Production company: ADDA Audio Visual Ltd.
 Distributing company: IFD Films and Arts Ltd.

References

External links
 

1987 films
1987 animated films